Alibertia is a genus of flowering plants in the family Rubiaceae. It is found in tropical America. They are dioecious trees or shrubs, with white flowers and indehiscent, often fleshy fruit.

Species
The following species are currently recognized: 
 Alibertia atlantica (Dwyer) Delprete & C.H.Perss.
 Alibertia bertierifolia K.Schum. in C.F.P.von Martius & auct. suc. (eds.)
 Alibertia claviflora K.Schum. in C.F.P.von Martius & auct. suc. (eds.)
 Alibertia curviflora K.Schum. in C.F.P.von Martius & auct. suc. (eds.)
 Alibertia duckeana Delprete & C.H.Perss.
 Alibertia dwyeri Delprete & C.H.Perss.
 Alibertia edulis (Rich.) A.Rich. ex DC.
 Alibertia latifolia (Benth.) K.Schum. in C.F.P.von Martius & auct. suc. (eds.)
 Alibertia occidentalis Delprete & C.H.Perss.
 Alibertia patinoi (Cuatrec.) Delprete & C.H.Perss.
 Alibertia sorbilis Huber ex Ducke
 Alibertia tessmannii (Standl.) Delprete & C.H.Perss.
 Alibertia venezuelensis (Steyerm.) Delprete & C.H.Perss.
 Alibertia verticillata (Ducke) W.Schultze-Motel

References 

Rubiaceae genera
Cordiereae
Flora of South America
Dioecious plants